Woodhouse Park is an area of Wythenshawe in south Manchester, England. The population of the ward at the 2011 census was 13,519.

Geography 
The area incorporates Wythenshawe town centre and borders onto Newall Green but is separated by the M56 motorway from which it is served by Junctions 4 (Wythenshawe) and 5 (Manchester Airport). It also borders on Moss Nook to the south and south-east, Peel Hall to the east and Benchill to the north. All of these are also localities within the Wythenshawe area, the others areas being Baguley, Northenden, Sharston and Northern Moor.

Much public investment in the area has taken place since 2003, including the expansion of Wythenshawe town centre. As of November 2014, the Manchester Metrolink Airport Line now runs through Woodhouse Park.

Governance 

Sharston is part of the Wythenshawe and Sale East constituency, represented by the Labour Party MP Mike Kane.

In 2003, Benchill was disestablished as a local government ward and the area divided between Woodhouse Park, Sharston, and Northenden.

The Manchester City Council Woodhouse Park electoral Ward incorporates the areas of Woodhouse Park described above as well as Moss Nook, Ringway Parish Council and Manchester Airport and has three Councillors to represent all these areas: Edward Newman (Lab), Rob Nunney (Grn), and Astrid Johnson (Grn).

 indicates seat up for re-election.

Housing 
As part of Wythenshawe, the majority of housing in Woodhouse Park is social housing, mostly former council housing stock. Following a democratic vote, the former council properties are now under the control of local housing associations. Due to greater access to government funding, the housing associations have invested a great deal into the local area, improving the quality of maintenance of the housing stock. Local leisure facilities have also been improved as part of an urban regeneration programme.

Police
The Greater Manchester Police is responsible for Woodhouse Park.

References

External links 
Woodhouse Park ward boundary - PDF file

Areas of Manchester
Manchester City Council Wards
Wythenshawe